Dolič is a village in the Municipality of Kuzma in the Prekmurje region of Slovenia.

References

External links
Dolič on Geopedia

Populated places in the Municipality of Kuzma